Shirley McLoughlin (born 1930) is a former Canadian politician, who was the leader of the British Columbia Liberal Party from 1981 to 1983. She was the first woman ever to lead a political party in the province.

Prior to assuming the leadership, McLoughlin worked as a teacher, and served as the party's president. She ran as the Liberal Party of Canada's candidate in Comox—Powell River in the 1980 federal election, losing to Ray Skelly. She was elected leader of the BC Liberals at their leadership convention on May 25, 1981, over lawyer Tom Finkelstein and farmer Roland Bouwman.

McLoughlin took over the leadership at a time when the party was in unprecedented crisis; under her predecessor Jev Tothill, the party had run just five candidates provincewide in the 1979 election, and had failed to win a single seat in the Legislative Assembly of British Columbia for the first time in its history. She led the party to a modest resurgence, running 52 candidates in the 1983 provincial election and increasing the party's popular vote total by over 600 per cent compared to 1979, but again failed to win a seat. She was defeated in her own dual-member district of Vancouver Centre by New Democrats Emery Barnes and Gary Lauk.

She announced her resignation as party leader in August 1983. She was succeeded by Art Lee at the party's 1984 leadership convention.

She later served two terms on the municipal council of Comox.

Electoral record

References

1930 births
Female Canadian political party leaders
Leaders of the British Columbia Liberal Party
Candidates in the 1980 Canadian federal election
British Columbia municipal councillors
Women municipal councillors in Canada
Living people
People from Comox, British Columbia
British Columbia Liberal Party candidates in British Columbia provincial elections
20th-century Canadian women politicians
Liberal Party of Canada candidates for the Canadian House of Commons